Ahmet Zeki Soydemir (1883; Salonica (Thessaloniki) - Sep 4, 1954; Istanbul) was an officer of the Ottoman Army and a general of the Turkish Army.

See also
List of high-ranking commanders of the Turkish War of Independence

Sources

External links

1883 births
1954 deaths
Mass media people from Thessaloniki
Macedonian Turks
Ottoman Military Academy alumni
Ottoman Military College alumni
Ottoman Army officers
Ottoman military personnel of the Balkan Wars
Ottoman military personnel of World War I
Turkish military personnel of the Greco-Turkish War (1919–1922)
Recipients of the Medal of Independence with Red Ribbon (Turkey)
Turkish Army generals
General Commanders of the Gendarmerie of Turkey
Deputies of Erzurum
Burials at Turkish State Cemetery
Deputies of Çankırı